Jeff Gustaf Ahl (born 13 February 1987) is a Swedish politician. As a former member of the Sweden Democrats, he served as member of the Riksdag from 2014 to 2018.

Early life 

Jeff Gustaf Ahl was born on 13 February 1987 in Tyresö, Sweden.

In 2013, Ahl started his education at the Luleå University of Technology where he studied the bachelor's program for politics and community development.

Political career 

In 2014, Ahl was elected to become a member of the Riksdag for the Sweden Democrats but changed party in March 2018 to the newly started Alternative for Sweden and thus became an independent in the Riksdag due to Swedish parliamentary rules on changing parties. In the 2018 general election — Alternative for Sweden did not pass the 4% barrier for representation in parliament and as a result — Ahl lost his seat in the Riksdag.

Personal life 

Ahl is a supporter of the sports club Djurgårdens IF.

References 

1987 births
Living people
Swedish nationalists
Alternative for Sweden politicians
Members of the Riksdag from the Sweden Democrats
People from Tyresö Municipality
People from Boden Municipality
21st-century Swedish politicians